Donna Stone is an American athlete who is a former Olympian fencer and USA Fencing Hall of Fame member.

During her over 20 years competitive fencing carrier, Stone collected a World Championship 5th place, multiple Fencing World Cup medals, three US National Champion titles and two Pan American Women's Épée Team gold medals. She has fenced foil but became competitive in epee. She was inducted into the Fencing Hall of Fame in 2000. She is a coach at Rockland Fencers Club in New York State.

References

Living people
American female épée fencers
Olympic fencers of the United States
Female Olympic competitors
Pan American Games medalists in fencing
Pan American Games gold medalists for the United States
Fencers at the 1991 Pan American Games
Fencers at the 1995 Pan American Games
Year of birth missing (living people)
21st-century American women